The 2010 FIFA World Cup qualification UEFA Group 2 was a UEFA qualifying group for the 2010 FIFA World Cup. The group comprised Greece, Israel, Switzerland, Moldova, Latvia and Luxembourg.

The group was won by Switzerland, who qualified for the 2010 FIFA World Cup. The runners-up Greece entered the UEFA play-off stage.

Standings

Matches
The match schedule was established at a meeting in Israel on 8 January 2008. However, Greece and Latvia failed to come to an agreement on matches between themselves, and, since the match schedule was not finalised by 16 January 2008 deadline, FIFA conducted a random draw to determine the fixtures. The draw took place in Zagreb, Croatia at 16:00 CET on 30 January 2008, the eve of the XXXII Ordinary UEFA Congress.

Goalscorers
There were 86 goals scored during the 30 games, an average of 2.86 goals per game.

10 goals
 Theofanis Gekas

6 goals
 Elyaniv Barda

5 goals
 Alexander Frei
 Blaise Nkufo

4 goals
 Angelos Charisteas
 Omer Golan

3 goals
 Yossi Benayoun
 Ben Sahar
 Māris Verpakovskis

2 goals

 Georgios Samaras
 Vasilis Torosidis
 Vitālijs Astafjevs
 Aleksandrs Cauņa
 Ģirts Karlsons
 Andrejs Rubins
 Philippe Senderos

1 goal

 Kostas Katsouranis
 Dimitris Salpingidis
 Aviram Baruchyan
 David Ben Dayan
 Klemi Saban
 Salim Tuama
 Kaspars Gorkšs
 Kristaps Grebis
 Deniss Ivanovs
 Vladimirs Koļesņičenko
 Andrejs Perepļotkins
 Aleksejs Višņakovs
 Jurijs Žigajevs
 Fons Leweck
 René Peters
 Jeff Strasser
 Serghei Alexeev
 Valeriu Andronic
 Denis Calincov
 Gheorghe Ovseannicov
 Igor Picușceac
 Veaceslav Sofroni
 Eren Derdiyok
 Gelson Fernandes
 Stéphane Grichting
 Benjamin Huggel
 Marco Padalino
 Hakan Yakin

1 own goal
 Avraam Papadopoulos (playing against Luxembourg)

Attendances

References

2
2008–09 in Israeli football
2009–10 in Israeli football
2008–09 in Greek football
qual
2008–09 in Moldovan football
2009–10 in Moldovan football
2008–09 in Luxembourgian football
2009–10 in Luxembourgian football
2008–09 in Swiss football
qual
2008 in Latvian football
2009 in Latvian football